Thomas Goode may refer to:

Thomas Henry Goode (1933–1994), Canadian politician
Thomas Good (1609–1678), or Goode, English academic administrator and clergyman
Thomas Goode (tableware), historic English seller of tableware and cutlery
Thomas Goode (merchant) (1816–1882), South Australian merchant
Thomas Goode (pastoralist) (1835–1926), pastoralist in the Colony of South Australia
Thomas Goode (physician) (1787–1858), established European style spa treatment in Virginia
J. Thomas Goode, member of the Virginia House of Delegates 
Tom Goode (disambiguation)
Tom Goode (1938–2015), American football player
Tom Goode (politician) (1902–1983), Canadian politician

See also

Thomas Good (disambiguation)